Shresth Kumar (born 1988) is an Indian television actor.  He is known for playing the role of Sunny in Sawaare Sabke Sapne... Preeto on Imagine TV. He currently portrays Neeraj in Kaal Bhairav Rahasya on Star Bharat.

Career
Shresth made his acting debut on the Imagine TV show Kitani Mohabbat Hai as Salil Mittal. He was last seen in Sapne Suhane Ladakpan Ke as Aditya on  Zee TV.

Television

Filmography

References

1988 births
Living people
Male actors from Delhi
Indian male television actors
Indian male soap opera actors
21st-century Indian male actors